Henry Lockwood may refer to:

 Henry Lockwood (cricketer) (1855–1930), English cricketer
 Henry Lockwood (Master of Christ's College, Cambridge) (died 1555), priest and academic
 Henry Whilden Lockwood (1891–1944), mayor of Charleston, South Carolina
 Henry Francis Lockwood (1811–1878), English architect
 Henry Hayes Lockwood (1814–1899), American soldier and academic